Pharmaceutical Research and Manufacturers of America (PhRMA, pronounced ), formerly known as the Pharmaceutical Manufacturers Association, is a trade group representing companies in the pharmaceutical industry in the United States. Founded in 1958, PhRMA lobbies on behalf of pharmaceutical companies. PhRMA is headquartered in Washington, DC. 

The organization has lobbied fiercely against allowing Medicare to negotiate drug prices for Medicare recipients. At the state level, the organization has lobbied to prevent price limits and greater price transparency for drugs. PhRMA has given substantial dark money donations to right-wing advocacy groups such as the American Action Network (which lobbied heavily against the Affordable Care Act), the Koch brothers' Americans for Prosperity and Grover Norquist's Americans for Tax Reform, while rarely providing some donations to centrist or moderately right-leaning groups such as Center Forward.

Membership

Leadership 
Ramona Sequeira, President of Takeda’s Global Portfolio Division, is chairman of the PhRMA board. Vasant (Vas) Narasimhan, M.D., CEO of Novartis, is chairman-elect and  Daniel O'Day, Chairman of the Board of Directors and CEO of Gilead Sciences, is board treasurer.

Previous leadership includes: John J. Castellani, formerly head of the Business Roundtable, a U.S. advocacy and lobbying group, Billy Tauzin, a former Republican congressman from Louisiana, and John J. Horan, former CEO and Chairman of Merck & Co.

Members 
Current member companies include Alkermes, Amgen, Astellas Pharma, AstraZeneca, Bayer, Biogen, BioMarin Pharmaceutical, Boehringer Ingelheim, Bristol Myers Squibb, CSL Behring, Daiichi Sankyo, Eisai, Eli Lilly and Company, EMD Serono, Genentech, Gilead Sciences, GlaxoSmithKline, Incyte, Ipsen, Johnson & Johnson, Lundbeck, Merck & Co., Novartis, Novo Nordisk, Otsuka Pharmaceutical, Pfizer, Sanofi, Sunovion, Takeda Pharmaceutical Company and UCB.

Programs
SMARxT Disposal is a joint program run by the U.S. Fish and Wildlife Service, the American Pharmacists Association, and PhRMA to encourage consumers to properly dispose of unused medicines to avoid harm to the environment.

The Partnership for Prescription Assistance is a program by PhRMA and its member companies that connects patients in-need with information on low-cost and free prescription medication. PhRMA has in 2017 raised concerns over price increases for generic drugs out of patent by the company Marathon Pharmaceuticals over Duchenne muscular dystrophy treatment.

The company has advocated abroad in South Africa regarding pharmaceutical drug intellectual property rules.

In 2017, the organization had revenue of $455 million, $128 million of which was spent on lobbying activities.

The organization has notably opposed market pricing strategies of Valeant Pharmaceuticals, deriding the firm as having a strategy "reflective of a hedge fund".

In January 2018, the organization introduced the "Let's Talk About Cost" website, which makes the argument that much of the cost of medication goes to middlemen unassociated with pharmaceutical companies.

See also
 Association of the British Pharmaceutical Industry
 Ethics in pharmaceutical sales
 European Federation of Pharmaceutical Industries and Associations (EFPIA)
 Generic Pharmaceutical Association
 International Federation of Pharmaceutical Manufacturers Associations (IFPMA)
 International Intellectual Property Alliance (IIPA)
 Japan Pharmaceutical Manufacturers Association
 Pharmaceutical Inspection Convention and Pharmaceutical Inspection Co-operation Scheme
 Pharmaceutical marketing
 Portuguese Pharmaceutical Industry Association

References

External links
 
 Official website

Pharmaceutical companies of the United States
1958 establishments in the United States
Organizations established in 1958
Life sciences industry
Pharmaceutical industry trade groups
Health industry trade groups based in the United States
Medical and health organizations based in Washington, D.C.
Lobbying organizations in the United States
1958 establishments in Washington, D.C.